Doctor Dealer: The Rise and Fall of an All-American Boy and His Multimillion-Dollar Cocaine Empire is a 1987 nonfiction true crime book by Mark Bowden. It tells the story of dentist turned cocaine kingpin Larry Levin.

References

1987 non-fiction books
American non-fiction books
Non-fiction crime books
Warner Books books